Brian Thomas ("Bud" or "Buddy") Allin (October 13, 1944 – March 10, 2007) was an American professional golfer who won five PGA Tour events in the 1970s.

Early life 
Allin was born in Bremerton, Washington. He learned to play golf at age 13 while working as a caddie at the Santa Barbara Municipal Golf Course in Santa Barbara, California.

Amateur career 
A prodigal player, Allin attended Brigham Young University in Provo, Utah and was a member on the golf team along with Johnny Miller. He served in the Army as an artillery officer during the Vietnam War earning four decorations including the Bronze Star and an Air medal.

Professional career 
In 1969, Allin turned pro and qualified for the PGA Tour on his first attempt citing the fact that golf was no "big deal" compared to war.

Allin's first win on the PGA Tour came in 1971 at the Greater Greensboro Open when he defeated Dave Eichelberger and Rod Funseth on the first extra-hole in a playoff. He would win five times in five years between 1971 and 1976. His best season was in 1974 when he won the Doral Ryder Open and the Byron Nelson Classic, which propelled him to a ninth-place finish on the money list. His best finish in a major was a T-10 at the 1974 U.S. Open and the 1975 PGA Championship. He had 3 dozen top-10 finishes in PGA Tour events in his career; his last win came at the 1976 Pleasant Valley Classic.

After reaching the age of 50 in October 1994, Allin began competing on the Senior PGA Tour. He was nominated for Rookie of the Year in 1995, after an outstanding first full season. He also shot a Senior Tour record low round of 61 at the FHP Healthcare Classic that year.  His lone Senior tour win came in 1997 at the American Express Invitational where he 2-putted from 60 feet on the 54th hole to win by one stroke over Jim Colbert. He competed five full seasons before electing to leave the tour despite being exempt for the 2000 season. Allin devoted the last years of his life to teaching at the San Diego Golf Academy and authoring his instructional manual, Center-Line, as well as an instructional DVD, Preferences.  He lived in Boulder City, Nevada as well as California. He died in Hemet, California at the age of 62 from multiple forms of cancer.

Professional wins (9)

PGA Tour wins (5)

PGA Tour playoff record (1–0)

PGA Tour of Australasia wins (1)

Other wins (2)
1970 Utah Open, British Columbia Open

Senior PGA Tour wins (1)

Results in major championships

WD = withdrew
CUT = missed the half-way cut
"T" = tied

Results in senior majors
Results may not be in chronological order

DNP = did not play
CUT = missed the halfway cut
WD = withdrew
"T" indicates a tie for a place
Yellow background for top-10.

See also
1970 PGA Tour Qualifying School graduates

References

External links

American male golfers
BYU Cougars men's golfers
PGA Tour golfers
PGA Tour Champions golfers
Golfers from Washington (state)
People from Bremerton, Washington
Deaths from cancer in California
Deaths from cancer of unknown primary origin
1944 births
2007 deaths